In 1998, allegations of mass graves at Chemmani were made by a Sri Lankan soldier on trial for rape and murder. He claimed hundreds of people who disappeared from the Jaffna peninsula after it was retaken by Government troops from the LTTE in 1995 and 1996 were killed and buried in mass graves near the village of Chemmani. There are reports about 300 to 400 bodies being buried there.

Internationally observed excavations in 1999 found 15 bodies, two of which were identified as men who had disappeared in 1996. 
The findings led to charges against seven military personnel. The number of bodies exhumed is far less than the number originally alleged, and the Sri Lankan government stated that the local and foreign investigators found no graves as originally alleged and that there was no evidence of grave tampering either. Seven years later, the investigation remained open, but no further bodies have been found at Chemanni.

Allegations 
In July 1998, Sri Lankan Army Lance Corporal Somaratne Rajapakse, facing a death sentence for the rape and murder of student Krishanti Kumaraswamy and her family, made allegations about the existence of mass graves in Jaffna containing the bodies of those who had disappeared from the peninsula in previous years. Rajapakse and his co-defendants gave the names of 20 security force personnel allegedly responsible for the killings.

The Sri Lankan Ministry of Defense opened an investigation and the Human Rights Commission of Sri Lanka asked for United Nations assistance. In June 1999, Rajapakse identified a site where the bodies of two young men who had disappeared in 1996 were exhumed. Additional sites identified by Rajapakse's co-defendants yielded 13 more bodies.  The excavations were witnessed by international observers, including personnel from Amnesty International.

Investigation 
In December, a government team of investigators reported that 10 of the remains, including one skeleton that was bound and blindfolded, showed evidence of assault and murder. The cause of death was not determined for the remaining bodies.

Rajapakse and the others had alleged the existence of many more bodies. The Sri Lankan government claimed that "local and foreign experts" had reached "a unanimous decision that there are no such graves as originally alleged by the convicted prisoner Somaratne Rajapakse and others convicted of the Krishanthy Kumaraswamy rape and murder case."

Identification of the bodies continued into 2000, and in March, warrants were issued for the arrest of seven military personnel.

All of the suspects were released on bail, and as of 2004, the U.S. Department of State described the case as "pending". In January 2006, police from the Central Investigation Division said that they were awaiting instructions from the Attorney General to conclude the investigation begun six years earlier. A Colombo magistrate called the delay "unacceptable".

See also
Mirusuvil mass grave
Duraiappa stadium mass grave
Sooriyakanda mass grave

References

External links

Six years after Chemmani exhumation: Inquiry commission needed to review attorney general's department

Massacres in Sri Lanka
Human rights abuses in Sri Lanka
Mass murder of Sri Lankan Tamils
Mass graves in Sri Lanka